The 2021 League of Legends World Championship was an esports tournament for the multiplayer online battle arena video game League of Legends. It was the eleventh iteration of the League of Legends World Championship, an annual international tournament organized by the game's developer, Riot Games. The tournament was held from 5 October to 6 November in Reykjavík, Iceland. Twenty two teams from 11 regions qualified for the tournament based on their placement in regional circuits such as those in China, Europe, North America, South Korea and Taiwan/Hong Kong/Macau/Southeast Asia with ten of those teams having to reach the main event via a play-in stage.

"Burn It All Down" was the tournament's theme song, put together by PVRIS, while Denzel Curry, CIFIKA, Besomorph, and Wang Yibo from Uniq, produced their own respective remix versions of "Burn It All Down".

Edward Gaming of China's LPL defeated the defending world champions, DWG KIA of Korea's LCK, to win their first World Championship title.

Impact of coronavirus on the tournament
The COVID-19 pandemic, which was mainly confined to China in January and early February 2020, once again affected the scheduled multi-city hosting format that was most recently present for the 2019 League of Legends World Championship. On June 16, Riot Games originally announced the dates and locations of the event, with the event taking place in Shanghai, Qingdao, Wuhan, Chengdu, and the finals taking place in Shenzhen. However, due to travel complications arising from the COVID-19 pandemic in mainland China, Riot Games announced Reykjavík, Iceland (where the 2021 Mid-Season Invitational had been hosted), as the new host city for the event.

Due to complications arising from the COVID-19 pandemic in Vietnam, two teams from the VCS (Vietnam) were once again unable to participate in the tournament.

Like the 2020 event, the tournament did not feature a live audience as result of the pandemic.

Qualified teams and rosters

Qualified teams 
South Korea (LCK) and China (LPL) received an additional spot in the group stage, totaling up to four representatives each for their respective region. The qualification format for North America (LCS) changed to a one-season-per-year system, with the seeding decided by the cumulative scoreboard from the whole season and the results from their respective championship series. 

Due to Vietnam (VCS) being unable to field teams for the event, the third seed from Europe (LEC) received direct entry into the group stage. 

Top 4 regions in 2021 Mid-Season Invitational (LPL, LCK, LEC, PCS) are seeded to pool 1 in the main event's group stage for the summer champion.

Rosters 
 Player didn't play any games.

Venue 

Reykjavík was the city chosen to host the competition. All matches were played at Laugardalshöll without spectators.

Play-in stage

Play-in groups 
 Date and time: October 5–7, began at 11:00 UTC.
 Ten teams are drawn into two groups, with five teams in each group.
 Single round robin, all matches are best-of-one.
 If teams have same win–loss record at the end of play-in groups, tie-breaker matches are played. A two-way tie is not broken by the results of the head-to-head game those teams played, however the team that won in the head-to-head gets side selection in the tiebreaker game.
 The top team automatically qualifies for the Main Event, while 2nd to 4th-place of each group advance to the play-in knockouts and 2nd-place receive a bye to match 2. The bottom team is eliminated.

Group A

Group B

Play-in knockouts 
 Date and time: October 8–9
 King of the hill format with two branch. The 3rd-place teams from the group stage facing 4th-place teams from the same group in match 1. Winner will play against with the 2nd-place team from other group in match 2.
 Single-elimination. All matches are best-of-five.
 The upper-place team chooses the side for all odd-numbered games, while the lower-place team chooses the side of even-numbered games.
 The winners of the match 2 in each branch advances to the main event group stage.

Branch A2-B3-B4

Match 1 

 Date: October 8, 11:00 UTC

Match 2 

 Date: October 9, 11:00 UTC

Branch B2-A3-A4

Match 1 

 Date: October 8, 16:00 UTC

Match 2 

 Date: October 9, 16:00 UTC

Group stage 
 Date and time: October 11–18, began at 11:00 UTC.
 Sixteen teams are drawn into four groups with four teams in each group based on their seeding. Teams of the same region cannot be placed in the same group.
 Double round robin, all matches are best-of-one.
 If teams have the same win–loss record and head-to-head record, tiebreaker matches are played for first or second place. If more than 2 teams, tiebreaker placement is based on the combined times of teams' victorious games.
 Top two teams will advance to Knockout Stage. Bottom two teams are eliminated.

Group A 

Cloud9, FunPlus Phoenix and Rogue were in a three-way-tie for second place at the end of the group stage. Because all three teams had a tied record (1–1) with the other two, placement in the subsequent tiebreaker matches was determined by the combined game time of each team's wins. Cloud9 was awarded a bye to the second tiebreaker match for having the shortest total game time.

Group B

Group C

Group D 

All four teams in Group D were tied at the end of the group stage due to each team having a tied record (1–1) with the other three. The bracket of the subsequent tiebreaker matches was determined by the combined game time of each team's wins, with LNG Esports (shortest total time) facing MAD Lions (longest total time) and Team Liquid facing Gen.G in the first two matches. The losers were eliminated, while the winners qualified for the knockout stage and faced each other to decide the first and second place teams of the group.

Knockout stage 
 Date and time: 22 October–6 November, time for all matches 12:00 UTC.
 Eight teams are drawn into a single elimination bracket.
 All matches are best-of-five.
 The first-place team of each group is drawn against the second-place team of a different group.
 The first-place team chooses the side for the first games, loser of the previous game chooses the side for the next game.
 Teams from same group will be on opposite sides of the bracket, meaning they cannot play each other until the Finals.

Quarter-finals 
 The winner(s) will advance to the semi-finals.

Match 1 
 Date: 22 October

Match 2 
 Date: 23 October

Match 3 
 Date: 24 October

Match 4 
 Date: 25 October

Semi-finals 
 The winner(s) advanced to the Finals.

Match 1 

 Date: 30 October

Match 2 
 Date: 31 October

Finals 
 Date: 6 November
 The members of the winning team will lift the Summoner's Cup, earning their title as the League of Legends 2021 World Champions.

Ranking

Team ranking 

 (*) Not include tie-break games.

Regional ranking 

 The win-ratio is determined by number of won games compared the number of games played.
 Bracket stage wins are prioritized.
 (*) Does not include tiebreaker games.

References 

League of Legends World Championship
2021 multiplayer online battle arena tournaments
The Game Awards winners